Zavida (Serbian Cyrillic: Завида) or Beli Uroš (Бели Урош, "White Uroš") was a 12th-century Serbian royal who briefly ruled as Župan of Zachumlia and later held the title Lord of Ribnica.

He was a close kinsman, or even a son, of Uroš I of Rascia, although this has not been clarified (Stefan Nemanja's descendants are named Vukan and Uroš in several generations).

He ruled the province of Zachumlia before getting into conflict with his brothers, resulting in him being "exiled" (before 1113), to the Duklja region where he would hold the title of Lord of Ribnica (Part of present-day Podgorica). After the death of George I of Duklja in the 1130s, the family of Zavida regained some of its power in Serbia.

The first-born child of Zavida, Tihomir was chosen to rule over Rascia as a Grand Župan (highest title) following Byzantiums division of the Serb lands by Manuel I, his other sons were given česti (parts): Stracimir ruled West Morava, Miroslav ruled Zachumlia and Travunia, Stefan Nemanja was given Toplica, Ibar, Rasina and Reke.

One of his sons, Stefan Nemanja, would become the progenitor of the famous Serbian Nemanjić dynasty which would lead Serbia to its greatest extent in land and riches compared to others and even raise the title rank to empire.

Family
Tihomir (died 1169), oldest son, ruled as Grand Župan of Rascia (1163-(1166) 1168).
Stracimir (died after 1189), ruled the region of Western Morava (1163-(1166) 1168, 1169-?).
Miroslav (died 1196 or 1199), ruled Zachumlia (1163-(1166) 1168, and 1169 to his death).
Stefan Nemanja (1113–1199), youngest son, ruled as Grand Župan of Rascia ((1166) 1168 - 25.03. 1196).
Daughter(s), (as Nemanja and his brothers are registered as maternal uncles of Mihailo III of Duklja)

Grandson of Zavida was King Stefan the First-Crowned.

|-

References

А. Веселиновић, Р. Љушић, Српске династије, Нови Сад - Београд 2001, 35–36. 
 , 119–124.
Živković, T. 2006, "Zavida's sons", Zbornik Matice srpske za istoriju, no. 73, pp. 7-25.

12th-century Serbian royalty